Anastasia Gennadyevna Simakova (born 9 September 2004 in Omsk, Russia) is a Russian individual rhythmic gymnast. She is the 2019 world junior rope and team all-around champion. On the national level, she is a multiple medalist at the Russian junior nationals (among Candidates for Master of Sport in 2017, 2018 and 2019).

Career

Junior 
Anastasia Simakova was born in Omsk on 9 September 2004. She began training in rhythmic gymnastics at age 4. Simakova competed in the 2019 Junior World Rhythmic Gymnastics Championships where she became the World Junior Champion in Rope and Team events.

Senior  
Simakova competed at the 2020 Russian Rhythmic Gymnastics Championships placing 7th in the Individual Senior all-around final.
Simakova was registered to compete in the 2021 World Cup Sofia , along with Lala Kramarenko, that took place on March 26-28, however, both were withdrawn and there was no individual Russian representation. Simakova competed in the Grand Prix in Marbella, where she placed 3rd behind Viktoriia Onopriienko in the overall. She also came in 4th place in the ribbon final, 5th in the club final and 2nd in the ball final.

In 2022 she moved to Germany, following her parents who enrolled the program of repatriation for Russian Germans. She started to train in Felnbach with Yulia Raskina  in November, as of February 2023 she's waiting for the nationality switch.

References

External links 
 
 Anastasia Simakova at Gimnastika.pro 

Russian rhythmic gymnasts
2004 births
Living people
Sportspeople from Omsk
Medalists at the Junior World Rhythmic Gymnastics Championships